{{Infobox company
| name = Access Bank Ghana Plc
| logo = 
| type = Public
| traded_as = GA: ACCESS
| foundation = 
| location_city = Osu, Accra
| location_country = Ghana
| key_people = Frank W. BeechamChairmanOlumide OlatunjiManaging Director and CEOPearl NkrumahExecutive Director| num_employees = 
| assets = GHS:5.824 billion (US$861 million) (2020)
| revenue = :Pretax: GHS:878.1 million (US$129.8 million) (2020)
| industry = Financial services
| products = Loans, Transaction accounts, Savings, Investments, Debit cards,
| parent = Access Bank Group
| homepage = Homepage
}}Access Bank Ghana Plc, formerly Access Bank Ghana Limited, is a full service commercial bank in Ghana, licensed by the Bank of Ghana, the central bank and national banking regulator.

Location
The headquarters and main branch of the bank are located at Starlets 91 Road, Accra, Ghana. The geographical coordinates of the banks headquarters are:05°33'09.0"N, 0°11'24.0"W (Latitude:5.552500; Longitude:-0.190000).  

Overview
The bank offers universal banking services to institutional, corporate, commercial, and retail customers, across Ghana. As of December 2020, Access Bank Ghana had total assets of GHS:5.824 billion (US$861 million), with shareholders' equity of GHS:1.052 billion (US$155.5 million). The stock of the company is listed on the  Ghana Stock Exchange, where it trades under the symbol: ACCESS.

Access Bank Group
Access Bank Ghana is a subsidiary and component of the Access Bank Group, a financial services conglomerate with headquarters in Nigeria and subsidiaries in the Democratic Republic of the Congo, Gambia, Ghana, Kenya, Nigeria, Rwanda, Sierra Leone, Zambia and the United Kingdom. The group also maintains representative offices in China, India, United Arab Emirates and Lebanon. As of 31 March 2020, Access Bank Group was a large pan-African financial services organization with assets in excess of ₦7.28 trillion (US$18.82 billion).

Ownership
The shares of stock of Access Bank Ghana are listed of the Ghana Stock Exchange where they trade under the symbol: ACCESS'. The table below illustrates the shareholding in the company, as of 31 October 2017.

History
Access Bank Ghana became operational in 2009, with base capital of GHS:80 million. In March 2017, Access Bank Group completed an initial public offering (IPO) for its Ghana subsidiary, raising $6 million by selling a 6 percent stake.

In September 2022, Access Bank Ghana became the title sponsor of the Ghana Division One League (renaming the league as the Access Bank Division One League'') as well as the official banking partner of the Ghana Football Association in a USD250,000 one-year deal.

See also

List of financial institutions in Ghana
Economy of Ghana

References

External links
 Official Website

Banks of Ghana
Companies based in Accra
Banks established in 2009
Ghanaian companies established in 2009
Companies listed on the Ghana Stock Exchange
Access Bank Group